Damien David Greaves (born 19 September 1977 in Forest Gate, Greater London) is male former sprints and hurdling track and field athlete who represented Great Britain at the 2000 Summer Olympics in Sydney, Australia.

Athletics career
Greaves was a finalist in the European and World Championships as a junior, and progressed smoothly into senior ranks in 1997, running a best of 13.82 and winning the AAA title at the end of the year. He was consistently sub-14 in 1998 (best 13.85/13.84w) and represented England in the 110 metres hurdles event, at the 1998 Commonwealth Games in Kuala Lumpur, Malaysia.

In 1999 (13.86) when he made his second European Under-23 final after placing 2nd at the AAAs. In 2000 he had an excellent indoor season running four personal bests for 60m hurdles to 7.68 for 5th in his semi-final at the European Indoors. Outdoors he improved his best for 110mh to 13.75, 13.66w and 13.62. He was 3rd at the AAAs, but although he qualified for the second round he was unable to better 14 seconds at the Summer Olympics.

After bobsledding during the winter (17th place in World 2-man Championships), Greaves won the 2001 Scottish title in 13.70 and had a season's best 13.68 for 2nd at the AAAs. He was disqualified for two false starts in his heat at the 2001 World Championships in Athletics. In 2002, he was 2nd in the AAA indoor 60m hurdles in 7.75 and went out in his heat at the European Indoors. He ran a personal best of 13.54 for 3rd at the AAAs, but fell at the first hurdle in the 2002 Commonwealth Games final and his 13.90 heat time at the European Championships was not enough to advance.

He showed top form in 2003 to regain the AAA title in 13.66 and had bests of 13.68 and 13.50w in 2004. Having switched coaches from Lloyd Cowan and Colin Jackson to Mike McFarlane and lost weight, he ran a season's best of 7.68 in his heat but was slower at 7.75 for fifth in his 60mh semi-final at his fourth European Indoors in 2005. He won the 110mh at Loughborough in 13.59 but had to drop out of the European Cup team due to a trapped nerve in his back. He was disqualified for a false start in his heat at the AAAs.

Greaves narrowly missed the final when he was 5th in 13.71 in his heat at his third Commonwealth Games in 2006.

References

1977 births
Living people
Place of birth missing (living people)
British male sprinters
English male sprinters
English male bobsledders
Olympic athletes of Great Britain
Athletes (track and field) at the 2000 Summer Olympics
Commonwealth Games competitors for England
Athletes (track and field) at the 1998 Commonwealth Games
Athletes (track and field) at the 2002 Commonwealth Games
Athletes (track and field) at the 2006 Commonwealth Games
World Athletics Championships athletes for Great Britain